The spark-ignition petrol (gasoline) engines listed below were formerly used by various marques of automobiles and commercial vehicles of the German automotive concern, Volkswagen Group, and also in Volkswagen Industrial Motor applications, but are now discontinued.  All listed engines operate on the four-stroke cycle, and unless stated otherwise, use a wet sump lubrication system, and are water-cooled.

Since the Volkswagen Group is European, official internal combustion engine performance ratings are published using the International System of Units (commonly abbreviated "SI"), a modern form of the metric system of figures. Motor vehicle engines will have been tested by a Deutsches Institut für Normung (DIN) accredited testing facility, to either the original 80/1269/ EEC, or the later 1999/99/EC standards. The standard initial measuring unit for establishing the rated motive power output is the kilowatt (kW); and in their official literature, the power rating may be published in either kW or metric horsepower (abbreviated PS in Wikipedia, from the German Pferdestärke), or both, and may also include conversions to imperial units such as the horsepower (hp) or brake horsepower (bhp). (Conversions: one PS ≈ 735.5 watts (W), ≈ 0.98632 hp (SAE)). In case of conflict, the metric power figure of kilowatts (kW) will be stated as the primary figure of reference. For the turning force generated by the engine, the Newton metre (Nm) will be the reference figure of torque.  Furthermore, in accordance with European automotive traditions, engines shall be listed in the following ascending order of preference:
Number of cylinders,
engine displacement (in litres),
engine configuration, and
Rated motive power output (in kilowatts).

The petrol engines which Volkswagen Group is currently manufacturing and installing in today's vehicles can be found in the list of Volkswagen Group petrol engines article.

Air-cooled petrols 

The Volkswagen air-cooled engine was introduced in 1935 in Germany, produced in factories all over the world, and the last complete engine was produced in December 2005, Its production was ceased by anti-pollution laws and the last engine was produced in São Bernardo do Campo. Its air-cooled, four-cylinder, boxer configuration was unusual in its day for a production automobile, but has gone on to power millions of vehicles around the world, being considered one of the most reliable automotive engines of all eras.

Water-cooled 'boxer' petrols 

The Volkswagen wasserboxer was a horizontally opposed or 'boxer' water-cooled four cylinder petrol engine.  It was introduced in 1982, and was produced for ten years, ending in 1992.  The wasserboxer was only used in the Volkswagen Type 2 (T3) (T3 Transporter / Caravelle / Vanagon / T25).

Four cylinder EA111 petrols 

The EA111 series of internal combustion engines was initially developed by Audi under Ludwig Kraus leadership and introduced in the mid-1970s in the Audi 50, and shortly after in the original Volkswagen Polo.  It is a series of water-cooled inline three- and inline four-cylinder petrol and diesel engines, in a variety of displacement sizes.  This overhead camshaft engine features a crossflow cylinder head design, and directly driven auxiliary units.  The exhaust side is in driving direction, closest to the front of the vehicle.

0.8 R4: 25kW 
identification parts code prefix: 052; engine ID code: HE
engine displacement & engine configuration  inline-four engine (R4/I4); bore x stroke: , stroke ratio: 1.10:1 – oversquare/short-stroke, 195.8 cc per cylinder
cylinder block & crankcase grey cast iron; five main bearings, die-forged steel crankshaft
cylinder head & valvetrain cast aluminium alloy; two valves per cylinder, each with two concentric valve springs, sliding-finger cam followers, timing belt-driven single overhead camshaft (SOHC)
fuel system, aspiration 31 PIC or 34 PIC-5 single-barrel downdraft carburettor; cast alloy intake manifold, cast iron exhaust manifold
DIN-rated motive power & torque output 
application Volkswagen Polo (01/76-07/78 – Sweden only)

0.9 R4: 29kW 
identification parts code prefix: 052; engine ID code: HA
engine displacement & engine configuration  inline-four engine (R4/I4); bore x stroke: , stroke ratio: 1.18:1 – oversquare/short-stroke, 224.8 cc per cylinder
cylinder block & crankcase grey cast iron; five main bearings, die-forged steel crankshaft
cylinder head & valvetrain cast aluminium alloy; two valves per cylinder, each with two concentric valve springs, sliding-finger cam followers, timing belt-driven single overhead camshaft (SOHC)
fuel system, aspiration 31 PIC or 34 PIC-5 single-barrel downdraft carburettor; cast alloy intake manifold, cast iron exhaust manifold
DIN-rated motive power & torque output  at 5,200 rpm;  at 3,200 rpm
applications Volkswagen Polo (04/75-09/81), Volkswagen Derby (04/75-09/81)

1.0 R4: 37kW (Škoda) 
This engine was originally developed by Škoda Auto, before the company was acquired by Volkswagen Group, and is therefore NOT an EA111 engine. However, this engine was used in some VWs after the takeover.
identification parts code prefix: 047.D, engine ID codes: AHT, AQV (EU3), ARV (EU2)
engine displacement & engine configuration  inline-four engine (R4/I4); bore: , stroke: 61.2, stroke ratio: 1.18:1, 249.05 cc per cylinder, compression ratio: 10:1
cylinder block & crankcase cast aluminium alloy; three main bearings, cast iron cylinder liners, duplex chain-driven camshaft
cylinder head & valvetrain cast aluminium alloy; two valves per cylinder, 8 valves total, overhead valve (OHV) with pushrods and rocker shaft
aspiration cast aluminium alloy intake manifold, cast iron exhaust manifold, underfloor catalytic converter
fuel system common rail multi-point electronic sequential indirect fuel injection with four intake manifold-sited fuel injectors
DIN-rated motive power & torque output , 
applications SEAT Arosa (AHT: 11/98-02/00), Škoda Fabia (AQV/ARV: 10/00-08/02), Volkswagen Lupo

1.0 R4: 16v 51kW 
This engine entered production in November 1996, after supplies of the Ford-built 1.0 had dried up. It was called the AT-1000 by Volkswagen do Brasil.
identification parts code prefix: 036, engine ID codes: AST (Brazil), AVZ
engine displacement & engine configuration  inline-four engine (R4/I4); bore x stroke: , stroke ratio: 0.95:1 – undersquare/long-stroke, 249.7 cc per cylinder, compression ratio: 10.8:1
cylinder block & crankcase grey cast iron; five main bearings, die-forged steel crankshaft
cylinder head & valvetrain cast aluminium alloy; four valves per cylinder, 16 valves total, bucket tappets, timing belt-driven double overhead camshafts (DOHC)
aspiration plastic intake manifold, cast iron exhaust manifold
fuel system common rail multi-point electronic sequential indirect fuel injection with four intake manifold-sited fuel injectors; Total Flex Gasoline or Ethanol on Brazilian AST variant
DIN-rated motive power & torque output  at 5750 rpm;  at 4250 rpm
applications SEAT Ibiza (AVZ: 05/00-05/02, AST: 06/00-05/02), SEAT Cordoba (AVZ: 05/00-08/02, AST: 06/00-08/02), Volkswagen Gol

1.0 R4: 16v Turbo 82kW 
engine displacement & engine configuration  inline-four engine (R4/I4); bore: , stroke: , stroke ratio: 0.95:1 – undersquare/long-stroke, 249.8 cc per cylinder, compression ratio: 8.5:1
cylinder block & crankcase grey cast iron; five main bearings, die-forged steel crankshaft
cylinder head & valvetrain cast aluminium alloy; four valves per cylinder, double overhead camshafts (DOHC), intake variable valve timing
aspiration Garrett GT12 turbocharger, intercooler
fuel system & engine management multi-point electronic sequential indirect fuel injection with four intake manifold-sited fuel injectors; Bosch Motronic ME 3.8.3 engine control unit
DIN-rated motive power & torque output  at 5,500 rpm;  at 4,500 rpm
applications Volkswagen Gol, Volkswagen Parati

1.05 R4: 33-37kW 
Produced: 1981-1996
identification parts code prefix: 030, engine ID codes: GL, HZ, AAK, AAU, ACM, AEV, WVGS
engine displacement & engine configuration  inline-four engine (R4/I4); bore: , stroke: , stroke ratio: 1.27:1 – oversquare/short-stroke, 260.7 cc per cylinder, 
cylinder block & crankcase grey cast iron; five main bearings, die-forged steel crankshaft
cylinder head & valvetrain cast aluminium alloy; two valves per cylinder, 8 valves total, two concentric valve springs per valve, bucket tappets, belt-driven forged or cast steel single overhead camshaft (SOHC)
fuel system & engine management Pierburg 1B3 or Weber 32 TLA/32 TL carburettor, later with throttle body-sited electronic single-point fuel injection (SPI) and Bosch Mono-Jetronic or Mono-Motronic engine control unit
DIN-rated motive power & torque outputs – carburettor
 — GL
 at 5,600rpm — ACM
 — HZ
DIN-rated motive power * torque outputs – SPI
 at 5,200 rpm;  at 2,800 rpm — AAK, AAU, ACM, AEV
applications Volkswagen Polo (GL: 08/81-10/86, HZ: 08/85-01/92, AAK: 01/90-07/90, AAU: 10/90-07/94, ACM: 02/92-12/92, AEV: 10/94-06/96), Volkswagen Derby (GL: 10/81-11/84), Volkswagen Golf (HZ: 05/85-10/91), Volkswagen Jetta (HZ: 08/86-10/91, AAK: 01/90-07/90), SEAT Ibiza Mk2 (AAU: 02/93-06/96), Trabant 1.1 (WVGS: 1990–1991)

1.1 R4: 37-44kW 
Produced: 1974-1983
engine ID codes HB (FA*,GG**), HC (FJ*), HD; *= Golf/Jetta/Scirocco (1974-79), **= Golf/Jetta/Scirocco (1979-)
engine displacement & engine configuration  inline-four engine (R4/I4); bore: , stroke: , stroke ratio: 0.97:1 – undersquare/long-stroke, 273.2 cc per cylinder, compression ratio: 8.2:1 (HB); 9.7:1 (HB8); 9.3:1 (HC)
cylinder block & crankcase grey cast iron; five main bearings, die-forged steel crankshaft
cylinder head & valvetrain cast aluminium alloy; two valves per cylinder, single overhead camshaft (SOHC)
fuel system Solex carburettor
DIN-rated motive power & torque outputs
HB:  at 5,200 rpm;  at 2,800 rpm
HD: 
HC: 
applications Audi 50, Volkswagen Polo Mk1, Volkswagen Derby, Volkswagen Golf Mk1, Volkswagen Jetta (A1), Volkswagen Scirocco Mk1,
This engine weighs in at only  including the clutch but not the gearbox.

1.3 I4: 40-50kW (Škoda) 
This engine was originally developed by Škoda Auto, before the company was acquired by Volkswagen Group, and is therefore NOT an EA111 engine.  However, this engine was used in some Škodas after the takeover.
OHV, engine displacement & engine configuration  inline-four engine (I4); bore x stroke: , stroke ratio: 1.05:1 – oversquare/short-stroke, 322.3 cc per cylinder
cylinder block & crankcase cast aluminium alloy, three main bearings, duplex chain-driven camshaft
cylinder head & valvetrain cast aluminium alloy, two valves per cylinder with twin valve springs, overhead valve (OHV) with pushrods and rocker shaft
fuel system & engine management
 Pierburg 2E-E Ecotronic dual-barrel carburettor controlled by ECU
 Pierburg 2E3 dual-barrel carburettor
Jikov 28–30 LEKR dual-barrel carburettor that derived from above Pierburg 2E3
 Bosch electronic single-point fuel injection (SPI), Bosch Mono-Motronic engine control unit
 Siemens Simos 2P multi-point fuelinjection
rated motive power & torque output (see Škoda Favorit article for detailed variations)
135 –  at 5,000 rpm;  at 3,000–3,250 rpm
135B –  at 5,000 rpm;  at 3,000–3,250 rpm (from 1993, SPI with catalytic converter)
135M –  at 4,500 rpm;  at 2500 rpm (from 1996, MPI with catalytic converter)
136 –  at 5,000 rpm;  at 3,000–3,750 rpm
136B –  at 5,500 rpm;  at 3,000–3,750 rpm (from 1993, SPI with catalytic converter)
136M –  at 5,000 rpm;  at 2600 rpm (from 1996, MPI with catalytic converter)
applications Škoda Favorit 135, Škoda Favorit 136, Škoda Felicia. Later, 1.4 8V engine, that derived from this engine was used in Škoda Octavia and Škoda Fabia.

1.3 R4: 40-55kW 
Produced: 1977-1994 (Transverse), 1978-1983 (Longitudinal)
engine ID codes 2G, 3F, AAV, FY, FZ, GK, GT, HH, HJ, HK, HW, MH, MN, NU, NZ
engine displacement & engine configuration  inline-four engine (R4/I4); bore x stroke (mm): 75.0 x 72.0, 318.0 cc per cylinder
cylinder block & crankcase grey cast iron; five main bearings, die-forged steel crankshaft
cylinder head & valvetrain cast aluminium alloy; two valves per cylinder, single overhead camshaft (SOHC)
fuel system & engine management Pierburg 2E3 carburettor, later with electronic single-point fuel injection (SPI) and Bosch L-Jetronic or Mono-Motronic engine control unit
DIN-rated motive power & torque outputs
 at 5200 rpm;  at 2800 rpm (carb.)
 at 5000 rpm;  at 3000 rpm (SPI)
 at 5900 rpm;  at 3200 rpm (MPI, or 'GT')
applications Volkswagen Polo / Derby (Mk1, Mk2), Volkswagen Golf / Jetta (Mk1, Mk2), Volkswagen Scirocco (Mk1, Mk2), Volkswagen Passat (B1, B2), : Audi 50, Audi 80 (B2)

1.3 R4: 40kW 
engine ID codes ADX
engine displacement & engine configuration  inline-four engine (R4/I4); bore x stroke (mm): 76.5 x 70.6, 324.5 cc per cylinder, compression ratio: 9.5:1
cylinder block & crankcase grey cast iron; five main bearings, die-forged steel crankshaft
cylinder head & valvetrain cast aluminium alloy; two valves per cylinder, single overhead camshaft (SOHC)
fuel system & engine management electronic single-point fuel injection (SPI), Bosch Mono-Jetronic engine control unit
DIN-rated motive power & torque output  at 5,200 rpm;  at 2,800 rpm
applications Volkswagen Polo, Volkswagen Golf

1.3 R4: G40 85kW 

engine ID codes MM, PY
engine displacement & engine configuration  inline-four engine (R4/I4); bore x stroke (mm): 75.0 x 72.0, 318.0 cc per cylinder, compression ratio: 8.0:1
cylinder block & crankcase grey cast iron; five main bearings, die-forged steel crankshaft, cast pistons with increased size gudgeon pins
cylinder head & valvetrain cast aluminium alloy with post-production heat treatment; two valves per cylinder with two concentric valve springs, belt-driven forged steel single overhead camshaft (SOHC)
aspiration dual V belt-driven G-Lader scroll-type supercharger with 40 mm diameter inlet, side-mounted intercooler
fuel system & engine management common rail multi-point electronic sequential indirect fuel injection with four intake manifold-sited fuel injectors; Bosch Digifant engine control unit
DIN-rated motive power & torque output  at 5500 rpm;  at 3500 rpm
application Volkswagen Polo Mk2 GT G40 (08/86-07/94)

1.4 R4: 44kW 
engine displacement & engine configuration  /  inline-four engine (R4/I4); bore x stroke (mm): 75.0 x 78.7 / 79.14, 347.7 / 349.5 cc per cylinder, compression ratio: 8.8:1
cylinder block & crankcase grey cast iron; five main bearings, die-forged steel crankshaft
cylinder head & valvetrain cast aluminium alloy; two valves per cylinder, single overhead camshaft (SOHC)
fuel system & engine management electronic single-point fuel injection (SPI) and Bosch Mono-Jetronic engine control unit, later multi-point electronic indirect fuel injection with four intake manifold-sited fuel injectors (MPI)
DIN-rated motive power & torque outputs
 at 5,200 rpm;  at 2,800 rpm
 at 4,700 rpm;  at 2,800 rpm
applications Volkswagen Polo, Volkswagen Golf

1.4 R4: 44kW 
engine displacement & engine configuration  inline-four engine (R4/I4); bore x stroke (mm): 76.5 x 75.6 (1.01 ratio), 347.5 cc per cylinder
cylinder block & crankcase grey cast iron; five main bearings, die-forged steel crankshaft
cylinder head & valvetrain cast aluminium alloy; two valves per cylinder, single overhead camshaft (SOHC)
fuel system multi-point electronic sequential indirect fuel injection with four intake manifold-sited fuel injectors (MPI)
DIN-rated motive power & torque output  at 4,700 rpm;  at 2,800 rpm
applications Volkswagen Polo, Volkswagen Golf

1.4 I4: 44-50kW (Škoda) 
This engine was originally developed by Škoda Auto, before the company was acquired by Volkswagen Group, and is therefore NOT an EA111 engine.  However, this engine was used in some Škodas after the takeover.
engine displacement & engine configuration  inline-four engine (I4); bore x stroke: , stroke ratio: 0.97:1 – undersquare/long-stroke, 349.2 cc per cylinder
cylinder block & crankcase cast aluminium alloy; three main bearings, duplex chain-driven camshaft
cylinder head & valvetrain cast aluminium alloy; two valves per cylinder, overhead valve (OHV) with pushrods and rocker shaft
fuel system & engine management multi-point indirect fuel injection with four intake manifold-sited fuel injectors
DIN-rated motive power & torque outputs
 at 5,000 rpm;  at 2,600 rpm — AZE, AZF
 at 4,500 rpm;  at 2,500 rpm — AMD
 at 5,000 rpm;  at 2,500 rpm — AQW, AME, ATZ
applications Škoda Fabia Mk1, Škoda Octavia Mk1

1.4 R4: FSI 63-77kW 
engine displacement & engine configuration  inline-four engine (R4/I4); bore x stroke (mm): 76.5 x 75.6 (1.01 ratio), 347.5 cc per cylinder, compression ratio: 12.0:1
cylinder block & crankcase grey cast iron; five main bearings, die-forged steel crankshaft
cylinder head & valvetrain cast aluminium alloy; four valves per cylinder, double overhead camshafts (DOHC)
fuel system common rail electronic multi-point Fuel Stratified Injection (FSI) homogeneous direct petrol injection, up to 110 bar high-pressure fuel pump, stratified-charge combustion at partial load
aspiration two-position tumble flap in the intake manifold controlling the turbulence
exhaust up to 35% exhaust gas recirculation, NOx storage-type catalytic converter
engine management Bosch Motronic MED 7
DIN-rated motive power & torque outputs, ID codes & applications
 at 5,000 rpm;  at 3,750 rpm — AXU: Volkswagen Polo Mk4
 at 5,200 rpm;  at 3,750 rpm — BKG, BLN: Volkswagen Golf Mk5 (−05/05)
 at 6,200 rpm;  at 4,250 rpm — ARR: Volkswagen Lupo

1.4 R4 
identification parts code prefix: 030, ID codes: ABD, AEX
engine displacement & engine configuration  inline-four engine (R4/I4); bore x stroke: , stroke ratio: 1.01:1 – 'square engine', 347.5 cc per cylinder, compression ratio: 10.5:1
cylinder block & crankcase grey cast iron; five main bearings, die-forged steel crankshaft
cylinder head & valvetrain cast aluminium alloy; two valves per cylinder, 8 valves total, low-friction roller finger cam followers, timing belt-driven single overhead camshaft (SOHC)
fuel system electronic fuel injection
DIN-rated motive power & torque output  at 4,800–5,000 rpm;  at 2,750 rpm
applications Audi A2, Volkswagen Fox, Volkswagen Golf Mk3, Volkswagen Type 2 (T2) in Brazil, SEAT Ibiza, Volkswagen Polo Mk3
reference

1.4 R4: 16v 
identification parts code prefix: 036
engine displacement & engine configuration  inline-four engine (R4/I4); bore x stroke: , stroke ratio: 1.01:1 – 'square engine', 347.5 cc per cylinder, compression ratio: 10.5:1
cylinder block & crankcase cast aluminium alloy; five main bearings, die-forged steel crankshaft
cylinder head & valvetrain cast aluminium alloy; four valves per cylinder, 16 valves total, double overhead camshafts (DOHC)
fuel system multi-point electronic indirect fuel injection with four intake manifold-sited fuel injectors
DIN-rated motive power & torque outputs, ID codes
 at 5,000 rpm;  at 3,300 rpm — AHW, AXP, AKQ, APE, AUA, BCA, BBY, BKY
 at 5,000 rpm;  at 3,800 rpm — BUD, CGGA
 at 5,000 rpm;  at 3,800 rpm — BXW, CGGB
 at 6,000 rpm;  at 4,400 rpm — AFH, AFK, AUB, BBZ (discontinued)
applications Audi A2, SEAT Ibiza, SEAT Córdoba, SEAT León Mk1 (1M), SEAT Altea, SEAT Toledo, Škoda Fabia, Škoda Octavia II, Škoda Octavia II Tour (CGGA), Škoda Octavia II FL (CGGA), Škoda Roomster (BXW: 05/06->2011,CGGB:2011–>), Volkswagen Lupo, Volkswagen Polo, Volkswagen Golf, Volkswagen Bora, Volkswagen Jetta, Volkswagen New Beetle

1.6 R4: 48-55kW 
engine ID codes 496, 1F, AEE, AEA, ABU, ALM
engine displacement & engine configuration  inline-four engine (R4/I4); bore x stroke (mm): 76.5 x 86.9 (0.88 ratio), 399.5 cc per cylinder, compression ratio: 9.8:1
cylinder block & crankcase grey cast iron; five main bearings, die-forged steel crankshaft
cylinder head & valvetrain cast aluminium alloy; two valves per cylinder, 8 valves total, single overhead camshaft (SOHC)
fuel system & engine management
SPI: electronic single-point fuel injection (SPI), Bosch Mono-Jetronic engine control unit
MPI: multi-point electronic indirect fuel injection with four intake manifold-sited fuel injectors (MPI), Magneti Marelli 1AV engine control unit
EWG-rated motive power & torque output, ID code & application
 — 496: Volkswagen Industrial Motor (12/77-01/84)
DIN-rated motive power & torque outputs
SPI:  at 5,200 rpm;  at 2,800–3,400 rpm – AEA
SPI:  at 5,200 rpm;  at 3,400 rpm – ABU
MPI:  at 4,500 rpm;  at 3,500 rpm – AEE, ALM
applications Volkswagen Polo Mk3, Volkswagen Golf Mk3, Volkswagen Passat B3, SEAT Ibiza Mk2, SEAT Toledo Mk1, Škoda Felicia, Škoda Octavia Mk1

1.6 R4: FSI 81-85kW 
engine displacement & engine configuration  inline-four engine (R4/I4); bore x stroke (mm): 76.5 x 86.9 (0.88 ratio), 399.5 cc per cylinder, compression ratio: 12.0:1
cylinder block & crankcase grey cast iron; five main bearings, die-forged steel crankshaft
cylinder head & valvetrain cast aluminium alloy; four valves per cylinder, belt-driven and BLF chain driven(camshaft) double overhead camshafts (DOHC)
fuel system common rail electronic multi-point Fuel Stratified Injection (FSI) homogeneous direct petrol injection, up to 110 bar high-pressure fuel pump, stratified-charge combustion at partial load
aspiration cast aluminium alloy intake manifold, two-position tumble flap controlling the turbulence
exhaust up to 35% exhaust gas recirculation, NOx storage-type catalytic converter
engine management Bosch Motronic MED 7
DIN-rated motive power & torque outputs, ID codes & applications
 at 5,800 rpm;  at 4,400 rpm — BAD: Audi A2, Volkswagen Golf Mk4, Volkswagen Bora, Volkswagen Jetta Mk4
 at 6,000 rpm;  at 4,000 rpm — BAG, BLF, BLP: Audi A3 Mk2, Škoda Octavia Mk2, Volkswagen Golf Mk5, Volkswagen Jetta Mk5, Volkswagen Eos, Volkswagen Touran, Volkswagen Passat B6
reference

1.6 R4: 16v 88-92kW (GTI) 
engine displacement & engine configuration  inline-four engine (R4/I4); bore x stroke (mm): 76.5 x 86.9 (0.88 ratio), 399.5 cc per cylinder
cylinder block & crankcase grey cast iron; five main bearings, die-forged steel crankshaft
cylinder head & valvetrain cast aluminium alloy; four valves per cylinder, double overhead camshafts (DOHC)
fuel system & engine management multi-point electronic sequential indirect fuel injection with four intake manifold-sited fuel injectors; Bosch Motronic engine control unit
DIN-rated motive power & torque outputs, ID codes
 at 6,200 rpm;  at 4,000 rpm — AJV
 at 6,500 rpm;  at 3,300 rpm — ARC, AVY
applications Volkswagen Polo GTI, Volkswagen Lupo GTI, Volkswagen GX3

1.8 R4: G60 118-154kW 

engine ID codes 1H, PG
engine displacement & engine configuration  inline-four engine (R4/I4); bore x stroke: , stroke ratio: 0.94:1 – undersquare/long-stroke, 445.2 cc per cylinder, compression ratio: 8.0:1
cylinder block & crankcase grey cast iron; five main bearings, die-forged steel crankshaft, cast pistons with increased size gudgeon pins
cylinder head & valvetrain
 cast aluminium alloy with post-production heat treatment; sodium-cooled exhaust valves, automatic hydraulic valve clearance compensation, belt-driven forged steel single overhead camshaft (SOHC)
8v: two valves per cylinder each with two concentric valve springs, 8 valves total
16v: four valves per cylinder each with two concentric valve springs, 16 valves total
aspiration dual V belt-driven G-Lader scroll-type supercharger with 60 mm diameter inlet and electronically controlled boost regulation, side-mounted intercooler (SMIC), front-mounted intercooler (FMIC) on 16v variant
fuel system & engine management common rail multi-point electronic sequential indirect fuel injection with four intake manifold-sited fuel injectors; Bosch Digifant engine control unit, knock sensor
DIN-rated motive power & torque outputs, applications
8v:  at 5,800 rpm;  at 4,000 rpm — VW Golf Mk2 G60 (08/88-07/89), VW Passat G60 (08/88-07/93), VW Corrado G60 (09/88-07/93)
16v:  at 6,300 rpm — VW Golf Mk2 Limited 4WD (this version was a 'homologation special', and does not appear in any official parts catalogues)
reference

Four cylinder EA827/EA113 petrols 

The EA827 engine series was initially developed by Audi under Ludwig Kraus leadership.

1.0 R4: 37kW 

Produced: 1996-2005
identification parts code prefix: 030, ID codes: AER, ALD, ALL, ANV, ATE, AUC
engine displacement & engine configuration  inline-four engine (R4/I4); bore x stroke: , stroke ratio: 0.95:1 – undersquare/long-stroke, 249.7 cc per cylinder, compression ratio: 10.8:1
cylinder block & crankcase grey cast iron (cast aluminium alloy – AER/ALL); five main bearings, die-forged steel crankshaft
cylinder head & valvetrain cast aluminium alloy; two valves per cylinder, 8 valves total, initially: bucket tappets (AER/ALL) – later: low-friction roller rocker arms with automatic hydraulic clearance compensation (ALD/ANV/ATE/AUC), timing-belt-driven single overhead camshaft (SOHC)
aspiration plastic intake manifold, cast iron exhaust manifold – AUC with integrated starter/primary catalytic converter, underfloor main catalytic converter, exhaust gas recirculation on AUC
fuel system & engine management common rail multi-point electronic sequential indirect fuel injection with four intake manifold-sited fuel injectors; initially: Bosch Digifant engine control unit (ECU) (AER/ALL/ATE) – later: Bosch Motronic MP 9.0 electronic engine control unit (ALD/ANV/AUC)
EWG-rated motive power & torque output, application, ID codes
 — Volkswagen Industrial Motor (AER: 02/99-05/00, ATE: 06/00->)
DIN-rated motive power & torque output
 at 5,000 rpm;  at 3,000–3,600 rpm — (discontinued)
applications SEAT Arosa (AER: 02/97-09/99, ALL: 08/97-05/99, ALD/ANV: 07/99-07/00, AUC: 07/00-06/04),
SEAT Ibiza Mk2 (AER: 09/96-06/99, ANV: 08/99-07/00, ALD: 08/99-05/02, AUC: 07/00-05/02),
SEAT Cordoba (AER: 06/97-06/99, ANV: 08/99-07/00, ALD: 08/99-08/02, AUC: 07/00-08/02), Volkswagen Lupo (AER/ALL/ANV/ALD/AUC: 11/98-05/05) (?),

Volkswagen Polo Mk3 (AER: 09/96-12/99, ANV/ALD/AUC: 01/00-12/01) (?)
reference

1.3 R4: 40kw 
Produced 1972-1978

identification

parts code prefix: ?, ID code: ZA

 engine displacement & engine configuration
 1,297 cc (78 cu in) inline-four, bore 75 mm (3.0 in) × stroke 73.4 mm (2.9 in)
 cylinder block & crankcase
 grey cast iron, five bearings
 cylinder head & valvetrain
 aluminum reverse flow, two valves per cylinder, single overhead camshaft (SOHC) via toothed belt. 
 fuel system & engine management

Solex/Pierburg 30/35 PDSIT carburettor

 DIN-rated motive power & torque outputs, ID codes
 40 kW (55 PS) at 5,500 rpm, 94N⋅m at 3,200 rpm
 application
 Audi 80 (B1), Volkswagen Passat (B1)

1.6 R4 74-75kW 
identification parts code prefix: 06B, ID code: AHP (75 kW)
engine displacement & engine configuration  inline-four engine (R4/I4); bore x stroke: , stroke ratio: 1.05:1 – oversquare/short-stroke, 398.8 cc per cylinder, compression ratio: 10.3:1
cylinder block & crankcase aluminium alloy aluminium alloy; five main bearings, die-forged steel crankshaft
cylinder head & valvetrain cast aluminium alloy; two valves per cylinder, single overhead camshaft (SOHC)
fuel system & engine management
 multi-point electronic indirect fuel injection with four intake manifold-sited fuel injectors; Bosch ME 7 electronic engine control unit (ECU)
 electronic indirect injection Total Flex gasoline, LPG and/or ethanol (Brazil)
 ARM with Simos (by Siemens) ecu
DIN-rated motive power & torque outputs, ID codes
 at 5,800 rpm;  at 3,500 rpm — AFT, AKS (discontinued)
 at 6,300 rpm;  at 3,500 rpm — ABB (discontinued)
 at 5,800 rpm;  at 4,400 rpm — AEK (10/94-12/95) – Golf, Vento, Passat
 at 5,300 rpm;  at 3,800 rpm — ANA, ARM, ADP, AHL (discontinued)
 at 5,600 rpm;  at 3,800 rpm — AEH, AKL, APF, AUR, AWH (discontinued)
 at 5,600 rpm;  at 3,800 rpm — ALZ, AVU, AYD, BFQ, BFS, BGU, BSE, BSF, CCS, CHG, CMX (discontinued)
applications
Audi: Audi A3 Mk1 & Mk2 (AEH: 09/96-06/01, AKL: 08/97-06/03, APF: 06/99-08/00, AVU: 05/00-04/02, BFQ: 05/02-06/03, BGU: 05/03-05/05, BSE/BSF: 06/05-03/13, CCSA: 12/07-03/13, CMXA: 05/08-03/13), Audi 80 (ABB: 08/90-05/93), Audi A4 B5, B6 & B7 (ADP: 11/94-10/96, AHL: 10/96-07/99, ANA: 08/98-06/00, ARM: 08/98-10/91, ALZ: 06/00-06/08), Audi 100 (ABB: 03/92-07/93)
SEAT: SEAT Ibiza Mk2 (AFT: 09/95-06/99, AKL: 06/99-05/02, AEH: 01/00-05/02, APF: 03/00-10/00, AUR: 07/00-05/02), SEAT Córdoba Mk1 (AFT: 09/95-06/99, AKL: 06/99-08/02, AEH: 01/00-08/02, APF: 03/00-10/00, AUR: 07/00-08/02), SEAT León Mk1 & Mk2 (AEH: 08/99-10/05, AKL: 11/99-10/05, BFQ: 10/05-06/06, BSE/BSF: 07/05-12/12, CCSA: 07/05-12/12, CHGA: 12/09-12/12, CMXA: 05/10-12/12), SEAT Altea (BGU: 03/04-05/05, BSE/BSF: 05/05-06/13, CCSA: 12/07-06/13, CHGA: 09/09-07/15, CMXA: 05/10-06/13), SEAT Toledo Mk1, Mk2 & Mk3 (AFT, AKS: 09/96-03/99, AKL: 10/98-07/04, AEH: 11/98-07/04, BGU: 02/04-03/06, BSE/BSF: 05/05-05/09, CCSA: 12/07-05/09), SEAT Exeo (ALZ: 03/09-09/10)
Škoda: Škoda Octavia Mk1 & Mk2 (AEH: 12/97-12/07, AKL: 08/98-12/07, AVU: 08/00-04/02, BFQ: 04/02-12/10, BGU: 05/04-05/05, BSE/BSF: 05/05-06/13, CCSA: 11/07-06/13, CHGA: 08/09-11/12, CMXA: 11/08-06/13)
VW/VWCV: Volkswagen Polo Mk3 (AFT: 12/95-08/99, AEH/AKL: 10/99-09/01, APF: 03/00-10/00, AUR: 07/99-09/01), Volkswagen Golf Mk3 (AFT: 07/95-10/00, AKS: 04/97-10/00), Volkswagen Golf Mk4 (AKL: 10/97-05/04, AEH: 01/98-05/04, APF: 05/99-04/01, AVU: 09/99-04/02), Volkswagen Golf Mk5 (BFQ: 05/02-06/06, BGU: 01/04-07/07, BSE/BSF: 05/05-12/13, CCSA: 11/07-12/08), Volkswagen Golf Mk6 (CCSA: 01/09-12/13, CHGA: 03/09-12/13, CMXA: 10/08-12/13), Volkswagen Vento (AFT: 01/96-12/97, AKS: 04/97-12/97), Volkswagen Bora (AKL: 08/98-05/05, AEH: 09/98-05/05, APF: 05/99-09/00, AVU: 09/99-04/02, BFQ: 05/02-05/05), Volkswagen Jetta (74kW AHP: 05/98-01/02, BGU: 05/04-05/05, BSE/BSF: 08/05->, CCSA: 01/08-10/10), Volkswagen Touran (BGU: 07/03-05/05, BSE/BSF: 06/05-05/10), Volkswagen New Beetle (AWH: 11/99-10/00, AYD: 06/00-07/05, BFS: 06/02-09/10), VW Passat B4, B5 & B6 (AFT: 12/95-12/96, ADP: 01/97-10/97, AHL: 10/96-08/00, ARM: 01/99-08/00, ANA: 07/99-08/00, ALZ: 10/00-05/05, BSE/BSF: 05/05-11/10), Volkswagen Caddy Mk3 (BGU: 04/04-05/05, BSE/BSF: 06/05-05/15, CHGA: 05/11-05/15) Volkswagen Citi Mk1, Volkswagen VeloCITI, Volkswagen Citi Life

1.8 R4 50-74kW 
identification parts code prefix: ???
engine displacement & engine configuration  inline-four engine (R4/I4); bore x stroke: , stroke ratio: 0.94:1 – undersquare/long-stroke, 445.2 cc per cylinder
cylinder block & crankcase grey cast iron; five main bearings
cylinder head & valvetrain cast aluminium alloy; two valves per cylinder, bucket tappets, single overhead camshaft (SOHC)
fuel system Pierburg 2E2 carburettor 
EWG-rated motive power & torque output, ID code & application
 — 262: Volkswagen Industrial Motor (06/83-03/94)
DIN-rated motive power & torque outputs, ID codes
 at 5,000 rpm;  at 2,500 rpm — AAM, ANN, DD
 at 5,200 rpm;  at 3,000 rpm — RP
 at 5,500 rpm;  at 2,500 rpm — ABS, ADZ, ANP, ACC, ADD
 at 5,400 rpm;  at 3,000 rpm — 1P
 at 5,200 rpm;  at 3,800 rpm — AYJ
applications Audi 80, Audi 100, SEAT Ibiza Mk2, SEAT Córdoba Mk1, SEAT Toledo Mk1, Volkswagen Golf Mk2, Volkswagen Golf Mk3, Volkswagen Golf Mk3.5 Cabriolet, Volkswagen Golf Mk3 Variant, Volkswagen Vento, VW Jetta Mk2, VW Jetta Mk3, VW Passat B2, VW Passat B3, VW Passat B4, Volkswagen Santana 2000

1.8 R4 16V 102kW 

engine ID code PL, KR
engine displacement & engine configuration  inline-four engine (R4/I4); bore x stroke: , stroke ratio: 0.94:1 – undersquare/long-stroke, 445.2 cc per cylinder, compression ratio: 10:1
cylinder block & crankcase grey cast iron; five main bearings, die-forged steel crankshaft, cast pistons
cylinder head & valvetrain
 cast aluminium alloy with post-production heat treatment; sodium-cooled exhaust valves, automatic hydraulic clearance compensation, timing-belt-driven forged steel double overhead camshafts (DOHC)
16v: multi-valve|four valves per cylinder each with two concentric valve springs, 16 valves total
aspiration normal
fuel system & engine management Bosch K-Jetronic
DIN-rated motive power & torque outputs, applications
16v:  VW Golf, VW Passat B3, VW Scirocco Mk2 16V 
reference: Golf/Corrado/Passat Owners Handbooks

1.8 R4 82kW 
identification parts code prefix: ???, ID code: DZ
engine displacement & engine configuration  inline-four engine (R4/I4); bore: , stroke: 
cylinder block & crankcase grey cast iron, five main bearings
cylinder head & valvetrain aluminium alloy, two valves per cylinder, bucket tappets, single overhead camshaft (SOHC)
fuel system multi-point electronic indirect fuel injection with four intake manifold-sited fuel injectors
DIN-rated motive power & torque output 
applications Audi 80 (01/83-12/91), Audi 90 (08/89-12/91), Audi Coupé B2/B3 (08/86-07/91)

1.8 R4 20v 92kW 
This is a naturally aspirated version of the 1.8 R4 20vT.
identification parts code prefix: ???, ID codes: AGN, APG, ADR, ARG, APT, AVV
engine displacement & engine configuration  inline-four engine (R4/I4); bore: , stroke: 
cylinder block & crankcase grey cast iron, five main bearings
cylinder head & valvetrain aluminium alloy, five valves per cylinder, bucket tappets, double overhead camshafts (DOHC)
fuel system & engine management multi-point electronic sequential indirect fuel injection with four intake manifold-sited fuel injectors, 95 RON/ROZ unleaded; Bosch Motronic ME 7.5 electronic engine control unit
DIN-rated motive power & torque outputs
 at 5,800 rpm;  at 3,500 rpm
 at 6,000 rpm;  at 4,200 rpm
 at 5,800 rpm;  at 3,950 rpm
applications Audi A3 (AGN: 09/96-08/00, APG: 11/99-06/03), Audi A4 (ADR: 11/94-04/99, ARG: 07/98-11/01, APT: 02/99-09/01, AVV: 06/00-09/01), Audi Cabriolet (ADR: 04/97-08/00), Audi A6 (ADR: 10/95-11/97), SEAT León (AGN: 11/99-12/03, APG: 06/00-10/05), SEAT Toledo (AGN: 10/98-12/03, APG: 06/00-07/04), Škoda Octavia (AGN: 10/96-1999), Volkswagen Passat (ADR: 12/96-01/99, APT: 01/99-08/00, ARG: 02/99-08/00), Volkswagen Golf Mk4 (AGN: 10/97-11/00), Volkswagen Bora (AGN: 02/99-10/00)

2.0 R4 16v 100-110kW 
identification parts code prefix: ???, ID codes: ABF, 9A
engine displacement & engine configuration  inline-four engine (R4/I4); bore: , stroke: , stroke ratio: 0.89:1 – undersquare/long-stroke, 496.0 cc per cylinder
cylinder block & crankcase CG25 grey cast iron, five main bearings, die-forged steel crankshaft, forged steel connecting rods
cylinder head & valvetrain cast aluminium alloy, multi-valve|four valves per cylinder, 16 valves total, double overhead camshafts (DOHC)
aspiration cast aluminium alloy intake manifold
engine management Siemens 5WP4 304 (Golf & Ibiza) CIS-E, or Bosch Motronic, or Digifant (ABF) engine control units
DIN-rated motive power & torque outputs
9A:  at 5,800 rpm;  at 3,500 rpm (CIS-E & Motronic)
ABF:  at 6,000rpm;  at 4,800 rpm
applications SEAT Córdoba SX, SEAT Ibiza Cupra, SEAT Toledo, Volkswagen Vento/Jetta, Volkswagen Golf GTI 16V, Volkswagen Passat

2.0 R4 20v 96kW 
identification parts code prefix: 06B, ID code: ALT
engine displacement & engine configuration  inline-four engine (R4/I4); bore: , stroke: 
cylinder block & crankcase cast aluminium alloy, five main bearings, die-forged steel crankshaft, contra-rotating balancer shaft, forged steel connecting rods
cylinder head & valvetrain cast aluminium alloy, five valves per cylinder, 20 valves total, bucket tappets, double overhead camshafts (DOHC), continuous intake camshaft adjustment
aspiration two-position variable cast aluminium alloy intake manifold
fuel system & engine management multi-point electronic sequential indirect fuel injection with four intake manifold-sited fuel injectors, 95 RON/ROZ unleaded; Bosch Motronic electronic engine control unit (ECU)
DIN-rated motive power & torque output  at 5,700 rpm;  at 3,300 rpm
applications Audi A4 (12/00-06/08), Audi A6 (06/01-01/05), Volkswagen Passat (11/01-05/05)

2.0 R4 16v FSI (EA113)
identification parts code prefix: 06D, ID code: AXW, BPG, BWT (North America)
engine displacement & engine configuration  inline-four engine (R4/I4); bore x stroke: , stroke ratio: 0.89:1 – undersquare/long-stroke, 496.1 cc per cylinder, compression ratio: 11.5:1
cylinder block & crankcase AlSi aluminium alloy; five main bearings, die-forged steel crankshaft
cylinder head & valvetrain cast aluminium alloy; four valves per cylinder, 16 valves total, low-friction roller finger cam followers, double overhead camshaft (DOHC), continuously adjustable intake camshaft
aspiration variable intake manifold and dual-branch front pipe
fuel system common rail Fuel Stratified Injection (FSI), single-piston high-pressure injection pump, air-guided homogeneous combustion process, stratified lean-burn operation with excess air at part load
DIN-rated motive power & torque output  at 6,000 rpm;  at 3,500 rpm
applications VW Golf Mk5, VW Jetta, VW Passat, Audi A3, Audi A4, Škoda Octavia, SEAT León, SEAT Toledo, SEAT Altea
reference

Four cylinder LT/MWM petrols

2.0 R4 52-55kW (EA831) 
This engine was designed by Audi for sole use in the Volkswagen LT. Other versions of this engine were installed in cars as diverse as the Porsche 924 and the AMC Gremlin.
identification parts code prefix: 046, ID codes: CL, CH
engine displacement & engine configuration  inline-four engine (R4/I4); bore x stroke: , stroke ratio: 1.02:1 – 'square engine', 496.0 cc per cylinder, compression ratios: CL – 7.0:1, CH – 8.3:1
cylinder block & crankcase grey cast iron; five main bearings, die-forged steel crankshaft, cast alloy oil sump
cylinder head & valvetrain cast aluminium alloy; two valves per cylinder each with two concentric valve springs, 8 valves total, screw-adjustable bucket tappets, timing-belt-driven single overhead camshaft (SOHC)
fuel system 35 PDSIT 28 mm or 1B1 single-barrel carburettor, 85 RON petrol, 80 RON for CL
DIN-rated motive power & torque outputs, ID codes
CL:  at 4,300 rpm;  at 2,400
CH:  at 4,300 rpm;  at 2,400
application Volkswagen LT (CH: 04/75-11/82, CL: 05/76-??/??)

2.3 R4 105kW 
identification parts code prefix: 00A, ID code: AGL Mercedes-Benz M111 engine
engine displacement & engine configuration  inline-four engine (R4/I4); bore:  stroke: , stroke ratio: 1.03:1,  573.7 cc per cylinder, viscous cooling fan
cylinder block & crankcase grey cast iron; five main bearings, die-forged steel crankshaft
cylinder head & valvetrain cast aluminium alloy; two valves per cylinder, 8 valves total, bucket tappets, duplex roller chain-driven double overhead camshafts (DOHC)
aspiration cast aluminium alloy intake manifold with separate throttle valve body, cast iron exhaust manifold; exhaust gas recirculation (EGR)
fuel system, ignition system & engine management fuel tank sited electric fuel pump, multi-point electronic indirect fuel injection with four intake manifold-sited fuel injectors; two dual-output ignition coils, electronic engine control unit (ECU)
DIN-rated motive power & torque output 
application Volkswagen LT (05/96-11/01)

Five cylinder petrols

1.9 R5 10v 
identification parts code prefix: 035
engine displacement & engine configuration , inline five engine (R5/I5); bore x stroke: , stroke ratio: 1.03:1 – oversquare/short-stroke, 384.2 cc per cylinder
cylinder block & crankcase grey cast iron, very small run in aluminium; six main bearings, pressed steel oil sump
cylinder head & valvetrain cast aluminium alloy; two valves per cylinder, each with two concentric valve springs, 10 valves total, shim-adjustable bucket tappets, timing-belt-driven single overhead camshaft (SOHC)
fuel system Keihin carburettor
DIN-rated motive power & torque outputs, ID codes
  — WH
  — WN
applications Audi 80 (WN: 08/81-07/83), Audi Coupé (WN: 10/80-07/83), Audi 100 (WH: 08/80-07/84), Volkswagen Passat (WN: 01/81-07/83), VW Santana (WN: 01/81-07/83)

2.0 R5 10v/20v 
identification parts code prefix: 034/035
engine displacement & engine configuration , inline five engine (R5/I5); bore x stroke: , stroke ratio: 1.05:1 – oversquare/short-stroke, 398.8 cc per cylinder
cylinder block & crankcase grey cast iron; six main bearings, pressed steel oil sump
cylinder head & valvetrain cast aluminium alloy
10v: two valves per cylinder, each with two concentric valve springs, 10 valves in total, shim-adjustable bucket tappets, timing-belt-driven single overhead camshaft (SOHC)
20v: four valves per cylinder, each with two concentric valve springs, 20 valves in total, bucket tappets, timing belt & simplex roller chain hybrid-driven double overhead camshafts (DOHC)
aspiration – 4v cast alloy intake manifold, tubular-branch exhaust manifold
fuel system
10v: Bosch K/KE-Jetronic multi-point indirect fuel injection with five intake manifold-sited fuel injectors
20v: electronic sequential multi-point indirect fuel injection with five intake manifold-sited fuel injectors
DIN-rated motive power & torque outputs, ID codes
10v:  — JL (Japan)
10v:  — SK, SL
10v:  — HP, JS, KP, PS, RT
20v: — NM
applications Audi 80 (JS: 08/82-07/84, HP: 08/83-07/84, JL: 08/83-07/84), Audi 90 (HP/JL/JS: 10/84-03/87, SK: 02/86-03/87, PS: 04/87-12/91, NM: 01/88-12/91), Audi 100 (KP: 08/84-12/87, RT: 01/88-12/90, SL: 02/86-12/87), Audi Coupé (HP/JS: 08/83-07/86, JL: 08/83-07/88, SK: 02/86-07/86, NM: 08/90-07/91), Volkswagen Passat (JS: 08/83-03/88, HP: 08/83-07/88)

2.1 R5 10v 
identification parts code prefix: 035
engine displacement & engine configuration , inline five engine (R5/I5); bore x stroke: , stroke ratio: 0.92:1 – undersquare/long-stroke, 428.9 cc per cylinder
cylinder block & crankcase grey cast iron; six main bearings, pressed steel oil sump
cylinder head & valvetrain cast aluminium alloy; two valves per cylinder, each with two concentric valve springs, 10 valves total, shim-adjustable bucket tappets, timing-belt-driven single overhead camshaft (SOHC)
fuel system Bosch K/KE-Jetronic multi-point indirect fuel injection with five intake manifold-sited fuel injectors
DIN-rated motive power & torque outputs
  — WE (Australia, Japan, Sweden)
  — WE, KM (Japan)
applications Audi 80 (WE-79/85 kW: 08/81-07/83), Audi Coupé (WE-79 kW: 08/81-07/82, KM: 08/82-07/83), Audi 100 (WE-79/85 kW: 03/77-07/82), Volkswagen Passat (WE: 01/81-07/83)

2.2/2.23 R5 10v 
identification parts code prefix: 034
engine displacement & engine configuration , inline five engine (R5/I5); bore x stroke: , stroke ratio: 0.94:1 – undersquare/long-stroke, 445.2 cc per cylinder
cylinder block & crankcase grey cast iron; six main bearings, pressed steel oil sump
cylinder head & valvetrain cast aluminium alloy; two valves per cylinder, each with two concentric valve springs, 10 valves total, shim-adjustable bucket tappets, timing-belt-driven single overhead camshaft (SOHC)
fuel system multi-point K/KE-jetronic indirect fuel injection with five intake manifold-sited fuel injectors
DIN-rated motive power & torque outputs, ID codes
  — WU
  — KZ, WB
  — KX, PX
  — JT
  — KE, KF, KL
  — KV
 — HY, KK, PR, WC, WG, WK
 — HX, KU
applications Audi 80 (KK/KL: 08/82-07/84), Audi 90 (KV: 06/84-12/91, HY: 06/84-03/87, KX: 01/85-03/87, JT: 08/85-03/87), Audi Coupé (KE: 08/81-07/84, KL: 08/82-07/84, HY: 08/84-07/88, KV: 08/84-07/91, KX: 01/85-07/88, JT: 08/85-12/87), Audi 100 (WG: 08/76-07/80, WC: 08/76-07/84, WB: 04/78-07/84, KF/WU: 08/82-07/84, KZ: 08/84-09/86, HX: 08/84-12/87, KU: 08/84-12/90, PX: 08/85-07/86, PR: 08/89-12/90), Audi C2 200 (WK: 10/79-09/82, WC: 10/79-07/84, KU: 08/84-07/85), Volkswagen Passat (HY: 08/84-07/88, KV: 01/85-03/88, KX: 08/85-03/88, JT: 08/85-07/88)

2.2/2.23 R5 10v turbo 
identification parts code prefix: 034/035
engine displacement & engine configuration , inline five engine (R5/I5); bore x stroke: , stroke ratio: 0.94:1 – undersquare/long-stroke, 445.2 cc per cylinder, oil cooler
cylinder block & crankcase
 grey cast iron; six main bearings, die-forged steel crankshaft, pressed steel or cast aluminium alloy oil sump
WR: cast aluminium alloy
cylinder head & valvetrain cast aluminium alloy; two valves per cylinder, each with two concentric valve springs, 10 valves total, initially: shim-adjustable bucket tappets – later: one-piece bucket tappets, timing-belt-driven single overhead camshaft (SOHC)
aspiration water-cooled KKK turbocharger with remote wastegate, intercooler, cast iron exhaust manifold
fuel system multi-point electronic indirect fuel injection with five intake manifold-sited fuel injectors
DIN-rated motive power & torque outputs, ID codes
 — KH
 — WX
 — MC
 — KJ, WJ, WS
 — JY, KG
 — 2B
 — GV, MB, WR, 1B
applications Audi Quattro (GV/WR: 07/80-07/87, MB/WX: 08/87-07/89), Audi 100 (MC: 03/86-12/90), Audi C2 200 5t/Audi C3 200 turbo (WJ: 10/79-09/82, WS: 08/80-12/81, KJ: 08/81-09/82, KH: 08/83-07/85, JY: 08/83-01/87, KG: 08/83-12/87, MC: 01/85-11/90, 1B/2B: 02/88-11/90)

2.2 R5 20v turbo 
identification parts code prefix: 034
engine displacement & engine configuration , inline five engine (R5/I5); bore x stroke: , stroke ratio: 0.94:1 – undersquare/long-stroke, 445.2 cc per cylinder, compression ratio: 9.30:1, oil cooler
cylinder block & crankcase grey cast iron, alloy for KW; six main bearings, die-forged steel crankshaft, cast aluminium alloy oil sump
cylinder head & valvetrain cast aluminium alloy; four valves per cylinder, each with two concentric valve springs, 20 valves in total, initially: shim-adjustable bucket tappets – later: one-piece bucket tappets, timing belt & simplex roller chain hybrid-driven double overhead camshafts (DOHC)
aspiration water-cooled turbocharger with remote wastegate, intercooler, tubular-branch exhaust manifold
fuel system & engine management common rail multi-point electronic sequential indirect fuel injection with five intake manifold-sited fuel injectors; Bosch Motronic electronic engine control unit (ECU)
DIN-rated motive power & torque outputs
  — RR, 3B
  at 5,900 rpm;  at 1,950 rpm — AAN, ABY
  — KW
applications Audi Sport Quattro (KW: 05/84-07/87), Audi Quattro (RR: 08/89-07/91), Audi C3 200 quattro (3B: 03/89-11/90), Audi S2 (3B: 09/90-09/92, ABY: 10/92-05/95), Audi C4 S4 (AAN: 08/91-07/94), Audi C4 S6 (AAN: 06/94-07/97)

2.2 R5 20v turbo 
, this engine generates the second highest specific power output of all (even current) Volkswagen Group engines.
identification parts code prefix: 034, engine ID code: ADU
cylinder block & crankcase grey cast iron; six main bearings, die-forged steel crankshaft, cast aluminium alloy oil sump
cylinder head & valvetrain cast aluminium alloy; 4 valves per cylinder each with two concentric valve springs, 20 valves in total, one-piece bucket tappets, toothed belt and simplex chain-driven (hybrid system) double overhead camshafts (DOHC)
aspiration water-cooled turbocharger, front-mounted intercooler (FMIC), tubular-branch exhaust manifold
fuel system, ignition system & engine management common rail multi-point electronic sequential indirect fuel injection with five intake manifold-sited fuel injectors; two LAZ pre-power output stage control units and five single spark ignition coils with Bosch spark plugs; Bosch Motronic electronic engine control unit (ECU), powered by PORSCHE
DIN-rated motive power & torque output  at 6,500 rpm;  at 3,000 rpm
application Audi RS2 Avant (03/94-07/95)

2.3 R5 10v/20v 
identification parts code prefix: 034 (054: AAR)
engine displacement & engine configuration , inline five engine (R5/I5); bore x stroke: , stroke ratio: 0.95:1 – undersquare/long-stroke, 461.9 cc per cylinder
cylinder block & crankcase grey cast iron; six main bearings, die-forged steel crankshaft, pressed steel or cast aluminium alloy oil sump
cylinder head & valvetrain cast aluminium alloy
10v: two valves per cylinder, each with two concentric valve springs, 10 valves in total, bucket tappets, timing-belt-driven single overhead camshaft (SOHC), compression ratio: 10.1:1
20v: four valves per cylinder, each with two concentric valve springs, 20 valves in total, bucket tappets, timing belt & simplex roller chain hybrid-driven double overhead camshafts (DOHC), compression ratio: 10.3:1
aspiration dual-barrel throttle valve, two-piece (one-piece on 20v) cast alloy intake manifold, two-piece cast iron exhaust manifold
fuel system & engine management
10v: Bosch KE-Jetronic multi-point indirect fuel injection with five intake manifold-sited fuel injectors
20v: common rail multi-point electronic indirect fuel injection with five intake manifold-sited fuel injectors; 'MPI' electronic engine control unit (ECU)
DIN-rated motive power & torque outputs, ID codes
10v:  at 5,500 rpm;  at 3,500 rpm — NG, AAR
10v: — NF Audi 100 Avant Duo
20v: at 6,200 rpm — 7A
applications Audi 80 (NG: 09/91-11/94), Audi 90 (NG: 04/87-12/91, 7A: 06/88-12/91), Audi Coupé (NG: 08/86-07/94, 7A: 11/88-07/91), Audi Cabriolet (NG: 06/91-07/94), Audi 100 (NF: 08/86-12/90, AAR: 12/90-07/94), Audi A6 (AAR: 06/94-06/96)

2.3 VR5 10v/20v 
This engine was sometimes badged as a "V5".
identification parts code prefix: 071/066
engine displacement & engine configuration  VR5 engine; bore x stroke: , stroke ratio: 0.90:1 – undersquare/long-stroke, 464.8 cc per cylinder
cylinder block & crankcase grey cast iron; six main bearings
cylinder head & valvetrain cast aluminium alloy
10v: two unequal-length valves per cylinder, each with two concentric valve springs, 10 valves in total, roller chain relay-driven double overhead camshafts (DOHC)
20v: four unequal-length valves per cylinder, 20 valves in total, roller finger cam follower, self-adjusting hydraulic tappets, simplex roller chain relay-driven double overhead camshaft (DOHC) with ECU-controlled variable valve timing for both inlet and exhaust valves, compression ratio: 10.8:1
aspiration plastic variable intake manifold, tubular exhaust manifold
fuel system & engine management common rail multi-point electronic sequential indirect fuel injection with five intake manifold-sited fuel injectors; 'MPI' electronic engine control unit (ECU)
DIN-rated motive power & torque outputs, ID codes
10v:  at 6,000 rpm;  at 3,200 rpm — AGZ
20v:  at 6,200 rpm;  at 3,300 rpm — AQN, AZX
applications SEAT Toledo (AGZ: 10/98-11/00, AQN: 09/00-11/03), Volkswagen Golf (AGZ: 10/97-02/01, AQN: 09/00-05/06), Volkswagen Bora (AGZ: 09/98-02/01, AQN: 09/00-05/05), Volkswagen New Beetle (AQN: 10/00->), Volkswagen Passat (AGZ: 09/97-08/00, AZX: 01/01-05/05)

2.5 R5 10v 
engine displacement & engine configuration , inline five engine (R5/I5); bore x stroke: , stroke ratio: 0.85:1 – undersquare/long-stroke, 492.1 cc per cylinder
cylinder block & crankcase grey cast iron; six main bearings
cylinder head & valvetrain cast aluminium alloy; two valves per cylinder each with two concentric valve springs, 10 valves total, belt-driven single overhead camshaft (SOHC)
fuel system & engine management common rail multi-point electronic sequential indirect fuel injection with five intake manifold-sited fuel injectors; Digifant electronic engine control unit (ECU) with Bosch distributor
DIN-rated motive power & torque outputs, ID codes
  — AXL
  — AAF, ACU, AEN, AEU
  at 4,500 rpm;  at 2,400 rpm — AET, APL, AVT
applications Volkswagen Transporter (AAF: 09/90-12/93, ACU: 01/94-10/96, AEN: 05/95-12/95, AET: 08/96-06/03, AEU: 08/96-06/03, APL: 05/99-12/99, AVT: 12/99-06/03, AXL: 04/01-06/03), Volkswagen California (AAF: 09/90-07/93, ACU: 08/93-10/96, AEU: 08/96-04/02, AET: 08/96-09/03, APL: 05/99-12/99, AVT: 12/99-04/02, AXL: 04/01-06/03)

2.5 R5 20v (EA855)
This engine was only used in the North American, South American, and is being used in Middle Eastern markets, as the replacement for the inline-four naturally aspirated 2.0-litre 8v.
This engine was replaced by the GEN3 EA888 I4 in North America.

identification parts code prefix: 07K
engine displacement & engine configuration  inline five engine (R5/I5); bore x stroke: , stroke ratio: 0.89:1 – undersquare/long-stroke, 496.1 cc per cylinder
cylinder block & crankcase GJL250 grey cast iron; two-part sump, 6-bolt cast or die-forged steel crankshaft with six steel main bearings, water-cooled oil cooler
cylinder head & valvetrain cast aluminium alloy; four valves per cylinder, 20 valves total, low-friction roller finger cam followers with automatic hydraulic valve clearance compensation, chain-driven (relay method, using two simplex roller chains) double overhead camshaft (DOHC), variable intake valve timing
aspiration Plastic intake manifold, single throttle body with electronically controlled 'drive by wire' throttle butterfly valve
fuel system multi-point electronic sequential indirect fuel injection with five intake manifold-sited fuel injectors
ignition system & engine management five individual direct-acting single spark coils with longlife spark plugs, Bosch Motronic engine control unit (ECU), secondary air injection during cold start phase to reduce emissions, single knock sensor
exhaust system one-piece cast iron 5-into-1 exhaust manifold, ceramic catalytic converter, two heated oxygen sensors (three when equipped with California emissions) for permanent lambda control
DIN-rated motive power & torque outputs, ID codes
  at 5,000 rpm;  at 3,750 rpm — January 2005 (BGP/BGQ/BPR/BPS)
  at 5,700 rpm;  at 4,250 rpm — from May 2007 (CBT/CBU)
applications
 BGP/BGQ/BPR/BPS: Volkswagen Jetta (2005–2007), Volkswagen New Beetle (2006–2011), Volkswagen Rabbit (Golf Mk5) (2006–2007).
 CBT/CBU: Volkswagen Beetle (A5) (2012–2014), Volkswagen Golf Mk6 (2010–2014), Volkswagen Jetta (2008–2013), Volkswagen Passat (2012–2014), in the middle east in Volkswagen Passat (till date), Volkswagen Rabbit (2008–2009).

Six cylinder petrols

2.4 R6 66-70kW 
identification parts code prefix: 073
engine displacement & engine configuration  inline six engine (R6/I6); bore x stroke: , stroke ratio: 0.89:1 – undersquare/long-stroke, 397.1 cc per cylinder, compression ratio: ??.?:1
cylinder block & crankcase grey cast iron; seven main bearings, die-forged steel crossplane crankshaft, pressed steel oil sump
cylinder head & valvetrain cast aluminium alloy; two valves per cylinder each with two concentric valve springs, timing-belt-driven single overhead camshaft (SOHC) directly acting on shim-adjustable bucket tappet valve lifters
aspiration cast aluminium alloy intake manifold (two-part on fuel injected variant), two cast iron exhaust manifolds
fuel system
DL: 2B6 or 2E3 dual-barrel carburettor
1E: Digifant fuel injection with six manifold-sited fuel injectors and one common rail fuel rail
DIN-rated motive power & torque outputs, ID codes
  at ?,??? rpm — DL
  at ?,??? rpm — 1E (with exhaust catalytic converter)
application Volkswagen LT (DL: 08/82-07/92, 1E: 08/88-12/95)

2.4 V6 30v 100-125kW 
identification parts code prefix: 077, 078; ID code: AMM, ALF, AML, AFM, APS, AGA, AJG, ALW, AMM, APC, APZ, ARJ, ARN, ASM, BDV
engine displacement & engine configuration  90° V6; bore x stroke: , stroke ratio: 1.05:1 – oversquare/short-stroke, 398.8 cc per cylinder, compression ratio: 10.5:1
cylinder block & crankcase grey cast iron; die-forged steel crankshaft
cylinder heads & valvetrain cast aluminium alloy; five valves per cylinder, 30 valves total, double overhead camshafts
fuel system & engine management multi-point electronic sequential indirect fuel injection with six intake manifold-sited fuel injectors; Bosch Motronic electronic engine control unit (ECU); 95 RON/ROZ(91 AKI) EuroPremium (regular) unleaded recommended for optimum performance and fuel economy
DIN-rated motive power & torque output, ID codes
  at 6,000 rpm;  at 3,200 rpm  — ALW, ARN, ASM
  at 6,000 rpm;  at 3,200 rpm  — AFM
  at 6,000 rpm;  at 3,200 rpm  — APC
  at 6,000 rpm;  at 3,200 rpm  — ALG, AJG, AMM, APZ
  at 6,000 rpm;  at 3,200 rpm  — AGA, AML, ALF, APS, ARJ
  at 6,000 rpm;  at 3,200 rpm  — BDV
applications Audi Cabriolet, Audi A6, Audi A4

2.4 V6 24v 130kW 
This 2.4 V6 is a smaller version of the all-alloy 3.2 V6 FSI – without the variable intake manifold and the FSI direct injection.
identification parts code prefix: ???; ID code: BDW
engine displacement & engine configuration  90° V6; bore x stroke: , stroke ratio: 1.05:1 – oversquare/short-stroke, 398.8 cc per cylinder, compression ratio: 11.3:1
cylinder block & crankcase homogeneous monobloc low-pressure gravity die casting hypereutectic 'Alusil' aluminium-silicon alloy (AlSi17Cu4Mg) with a closed-deck design, mechanically stripped hard silicon crystal integral liners, honed under simulated mechanical stress; die-forged steel crankshaft
cylinder heads & valvetrain cast aluminium alloy; four valves per cylinder, 24 valves total, simplex chain-driven double overhead camshafts, continuously variable valve timing system both for intake and exhaust
fuel system & engine management common rail multi-point electronic sequential indirect fuel injection with six intake manifold-sited fuel injectors; Bosch Motronic ME 7.X electronic engine control unit (ECU)
exhaust system two ceramic catalytic converters
DIN-rated motive power & torque output  at 6,000 rpm (15.5 m/s piston speed);  at 3,000–5,000 rpm;  (MEP)
application Audi A6 (04/04-09/08)
references

2.6 V6 102-110kW 
identification parts code prefix: ???
engine displacement & engine configuration  90° V6; bore x stroke: , stroke ratio: 1.02:1 – 'square engine', 433.0 cc per cylinder, compression ratio: 10.3:1
cylinder block & crankcase grey cast iron; four main bearings, die-forged steel crankshaft
cylinder heads & valvetrain cast aluminium alloy; two valves per cylinder each with two concentric valve springs, 12 valves total, timing-belt-driven single overhead camshaft
aspiration cast aluminium alloy intake manifold, two-stage dual-barrel throttle valve
fuel system, ignition system & engine management common rail multi-point electronic sequential indirect fuel injection with six intake manifold-sited fuel injectors; one LAZ pre-power output stage control unit and one 6-way ignition coil with longlife spark plugs; Bosch 'MPFI' electronic engine control unit (ECU); 95 RON/ROZ(91 AKI) EuroPremium (regular) unleaded recommended for optimum performance and fuel economy
DIN-rated motive power & torque outputs, ID codes
  — ACZ, Chinese market
  at 5,750 rpm;  at 3,000 rpm — ABC
applications Audi 80 (ABC: 07/92-07/95), Audi Coupé (ABC: 08/92-12/95), Audi Cabriolet (ABC: 01/94-08/00), Audi 100 (ABC: 03/92-07/94), Audi A4 (ABC: 11/94-07/98), Audi A6 (ABC: 06/94-10/97)
notes

2.7 V6 30v T 169-195kW 
identification parts code prefix: 078
engine displacement & engine configuration  90° V6; bore x stroke: , stroke ratio: 0.94:1 – undersquare/long-stroke, 445.2 cc per cylinder, compression ratio: 9.0–9.9:1
cylinder block & crankcase grey cast iron; four main bearings, die-forged steel crankshaft
cylinder heads & valvetrain cast aluminium alloy; five valves per cylinder, 30 valves total, timing belt and simplex chain-driven (hybrid system) double overhead camshafts
aspiration 'biturbo': two parallel turbochargers (one per cylinder bank), two side-mounted intercoolers
fuel system, ignition system & engine management common rail multi-point electronic sequential indirect fuel injection with six intake manifold-sited Siemens fuel injectors; six individual spark coils; Bosch Motronic ME 7.1 electronic engine control unit (ECU); 98 RON/ROZ(93 AKI) EuroSuperPlus (premium) unleaded recommended for maximum performance and fuel economy
DIN-rated motive power & torque outputs, applications, ID codes
  at 5,800 rpm;  at 1,750 rpm — Audi C5 A6 (AJK)
  at 5,800 rpm;  at 1,800 rpm — Audi C5 A6 allroad (ARE, BEL, BES)
  at 5,800 rpm;  at 1,800 rpm — Audi B5 S4 (APB North American market)
  at 5,800 rpm;  at 1,850 rpm — Audi B5 S4 (AGB, AZB)

2.7 V6 30v T 280kW (B5 RS4) 
Based on the Audi B5 S4 2.7 V6 biturbo, this engine was tuned by Cosworth Technology (now MAHLE Powertrain), and featured enlarged intake and exhaust ports on the cylinder heads, two uprated parallel turbochargers, and two side-mounted intercoolers (SMICs), together with new induction and exhaust systems, and a re-calibrated engine management system.  Due to the high performance nature of the vehicle, it was also fitted with a multi-baffled two-section oil sump to help prevent oil starvation during high g-force manoeuvres.

, this engine generates the highest specific power output of all (even current) Volkswagen Group engines.
identification parts code prefix: ???; ID codes: ASJ (EU2 compliant), AZR (EU3 compliant)
engine displacement & engine configuration  90° V6; bore x stroke: , stroke ratio: 0.94:1 – undersquare/long-stroke, 445.2 cc per cylinder, compression ratio: 9.0–9.2:1
cylinder block & crankcase grey cast iron; four main bearings, die-forged steel crankshaft
cylinder heads & valvetrain cast aluminium alloy; five valves per cylinder, 30 valves total, timing belt and simplex roller chain-driven (hybrid system) double overhead camshafts
aspiration 'biturbo': two parallel turbochargers (one per cylinder bank), two side-mounted intercoolers (SMICs)
fuel system, ignition system & engine management common rail multi-point electronic sequential indirect fuel injection with six intake manifold-sited fuel Siemens fuel injectors, six individual spark coils, Bosch Motronic ME 7.1 electronic engine control unit (ECU); 98 RON/ROZ(93 AKI) EuroSuperPlus (premium) unleaded recommended for maximum performance and fuel economy
DIN-rated motive power & torque output  at 7,000 rpm;  at 2,500–6,000 rpm
application Audi B5 RS4 (ASJ: 06/00-10/00, AZR: 11/00-09/01)
notes

2.8 V6 128kW 
identification parts code prefix: ???; ID codes: AAH, AFC
engine displacement & engine configuration  90° V6; bore x stroke: , stroke ratio: 0.95:1 – undersquare/long-stroke, 461.9 cc per cylinder, compression ratio: 10.3:1 (AFC 10.0:1)
cylinder block & crankcase grey cast iron; four main bearings, die-forged steel crankshaft, two-part cast aluminium alloy oil sump
cylinder heads & valvetrain cast aluminium alloy; two valves per cylinder each with two concentric valve springs (AFC has a single valve spring design), 12 valves total, self-adjusting hydraulic valve-play compensation, timing-belt-driven single overhead camshafts
aspiration  hot-film mass airflow meter (MAF), two-stage dual-barrel throttle valve, two-part cast aluminium alloy variable length intake manifold (380 mm short path, 780 mm long path)
fuel system, ignition system & engine management common rail multi-point electronic sequential indirect fuel injection with six intake manifold-sited fuel injectors; one LAZ pre-power output stage control unit and one 6-way ignition coil with longlife spark plugs; Bosch 'MMS' MPI electronic engine control unit (ECU) with cylinder selective knock control; 95 RON/ROZ(91 AKI) EuroPremium (regular) unleaded recommended for optimum performance and fuel economy
DIN-rated motive power & torque output  at 5,500 rpm;  at 3,000 rpm; redline: 6,700 rpm
updates from AAH to AFC
Valvetrain differences between original AAH design and later AFC design include
1) AFC camshaft provides different valve timing and is lighter.  2) AFC use single valve springs with less mass.  3) AFC inlet and exhaust valves have a smaller stem diameter with revised stem oil seals.
The AFC engine had a revised lubrication circuit and oil pan assembly, constructional detail includes
1) AFCs use a larger oil filter.  2) AFC engine oil cooler has a larger cross-sectional area.  3) AFC engines oil pressure relief valve is integrated into a cover assembly.  4) AFC engines oil pickup is integrated into the upper section of the oil sump, with a revised lower oil sump gasket.
applications Audi 80 / Audi 90 (AAH: 09/91-07/95 {North America: 01/92-05/95, AFC: 07/93-07/95}), Audi Coupé (AAH: 08/91-12/95), Audi Cabriolet (AAH: 11/92-08/00 {North America: 11/93-07/94, AFC: 08/94-07/98}), Audi 100 (AAH: 12/90-07/94 {North America: 10/91-07/94}), Audi A4 (AAH: 11/94-07/97 {North America: 06/94-07/95, AFC: 07/95-07/97}), Audi A6 (AAH: 06/94-10/97 {North America: 06/94-07/95}, AFC: 08/94-06/95 {North America: 08/94-10/97}), Audi A8 (AAH: 06/94-03/96)
references

2.8 VR6 103-130kW 
identification parts code prefix: 021
engine displacement & engine configuration  15° VR6 engine; bore x stroke: , stroke ratio: 0.90:1 – undersquare/long-stroke, 465.3 cc per cylinder, compression ratio: 10.5:1
cylinder block & crankcase grey cast iron; seven main bearings, die-forged steel crankshaft
cylinder head & valvetrain cast aluminium alloy; two valves per cylinder, 12 valves total, double overhead camshafts (DOHC)
fuel system & engine management multi-point electronic sequential indirect fuel injection with six intake manifold-sited fuel injectors; Bosch Motronic M2.7/M2.9/M3.8.1 ME 7.1 electronic engine control unit (ECU); 98 RON/ROZ(95 AKI) EuroPremium (regular) unleaded recommended for optimum performance and fuel economy
DIN-rated motive power & torque outputs, ID codes
  — AES VW Eurovan (05/96-05/00 – North America only)
  at 5,800 rpm;  at 4,200 rpm — AAA
  — AFP
applications Volkswagen Corrado, Volkswagen Golf Mk3, Volkswagen Golf Mk4, Volkswagen Jetta (AAA, AFP), Volkswagen Passat (AAA), Volkswagen Sharan, Volkswagen Transporter (T4)

Awards 
was placed in the 1995 annual list of Ward's 10 Best Engines

2.8 V6 30v 137-142kW 
identification parts code prefix: 078; ID code: ACK, AGE, AHA, ALG, AMX, APR, AQD, ATQ, ATX, BBG
engine displacement & engine configuration  90° V6; bore x stroke: , stroke ratio: 0.95:1 – undersquare/long-stroke, 461.9 cc per cylinder, compression ratio: 10.1:1 (AGE, ATX, BBG); 10.3:1 (ALG, AMX), 10.6:1 (ACK, AHA, APR, AQD, ATQ)
cylinder block & crankcase grey cast iron; four main bearings, die-forged steel crankshaft
cylinder heads & valvetrain cast aluminium alloy; five valves per cylinder, 30 valves total, timing belt and simplex roller chain-driven (hybrid system) double overhead camshafts
aspiration cast aluminium alloy two-position variable intake manifold
fuel system & engine management multi-point electronic sequential indirect fuel injection with six intake manifold-sited fuel injectors; Bosch Motronic electronic engine control unit (ECU); 98 RON/ROZ(93 AKI) EuroSuperPlus (premium) unleaded recommended for optimum performance and fuel economy (ACK, AHA, ALG, AMX, APR, AQD, ATQ); 95 RON/ROZ(91 AKI) EuroPremium (regular) unleaded allowed (AGE, ATX, BBG)
DIN-rated motive power & torque output, ID codes
  at 6,000 rpm;  at 3,200 rpm  — AGE
  at 6,000 rpm;  at 3,200 rpm  — ATX, BBG
  at 6,000 rpm;  at 3,200 rpm  — ALG, AMX
  at 6,000 rpm;  at 3,200 rpm  — ACK, AHA, APR, AQD, ATQ
applications Audi B5 A4 (03/96-12/98), Audi A6 (10/95-01/99), Audi D2 A8 (07/95-01/99), VW Passat B5 & B5.5 (1997–2005)
notes

2.8 VR6 24v 147-150kW 
identification parts code prefix: 022; ID codes: AQP, AUE, AXK (USA), AYL, BDE, BDF (USA)
engine displacement & engine configuration  15° VR6; bore x stroke: , stroke ratio: 0.90:1 – undersquare/long-stroke, 465.3 cc per cylinder, compression ratio: 10.7:1
cylinder block & crankcase grey cast iron; seven main bearings, die-forged steel crankshaft
cylinder head & valvetrain cast aluminium alloy; four unequal-length valves per cylinder, 24 valves total, double overhead camshafts (DOHC)
fuel system & engine management multi-point electronic sequential indirect fuel injection with six intake manifold-sited fuel injectors; Bosch Motronic ME 7.1 electronic engine control unit (ECU); 95 RON/ROZ(91 AKI) EuroPremium (regular) unleaded recommended for optimum performance and fuel economy
DIN-rated motive power & torque outputs, ID codes
  — BDF, USA-only, Jetta (10/01-06/04), Golf (03/02->)
  at 6,200 rpm;  at 2,400–5,500 rpm — AXK, USA-only VW Eurovan (05/00-06/03)
  at 6,200 rpm;  at 3,400 rpm
applications Volkswagen Golf Mk4 (AUE: 01/00-04/01), VW Bora (AUE: 03/00-04/01), SEAT León 1M Cupra 4 (AUE: 10/00-07/01, BDE: 06/01-04/04), SEAT Alhambra (AUE: 06/00-04/02, AYL: 06/00->), Volkswagen Sharan (AYL: 04/00-05/08)
notes

2.9 VR6 140kW 
identification parts code prefix: 021; ID codes: ABV
engine displacement & engine configuration 2.9 litre 15° VR6; bore x stroke (mm): 82.0 x 90.3
cylinder block & crankcase grey cast iron; seven main bearings, die-forged steel crankshaft
cylinder head & valvetrain cast aluminium alloy; two valves per cylinder, 12 valves total, duplex chain-driven double overhead camshafts (DOHC)
fuel system & engine management common rail multi-point electronic sequential indirect fuel injection with six intake manifold-sited fuel injectors; Bosch Motronic M 2.9 electronic engine control unit (ECU); 98 RON/ROZ(95 AKI) EuroPremium (regular) unleaded recommended for optimum performance and fuel economy
DIN-rated motive power & torque outputs, applications
  — VW Passat B4 VR6 (10/94-12/96)
  at 5,800 rpm;  at 4,200 rpm — Volkswagen Corrado VR6 (08/91-07/95), VW Golf Mk3 VR6 (10/94-12/97)
notes

Eight cylinder petrols 

All Volkswagen Group V8 and W8 petrol engines are constructed from a lightweight, cast aluminium alloy cylinder block (crankcase) and cylinder heads.  They all use multi-valve technology, with the valves being operated by two overhead camshafts per cylinder bank (sometimes referred to as 'quad cam').  All functions of engine control are carried out by varying types of Robert Bosch GmbH Motronic electronic engine control units.  They are all longitudinally front-mounted, and the V8 engines listed below were for a long time only used in cars bearing the Audi marque, but latterly being installed in Volkswagen Passenger Cars flagship Volkswagen Phaeton.

3.6 V8 32v 184kW 
identification parts code prefix: 077, ID code: PT
engine displacement & engine configuration  90° V8; bore x stroke: , stroke ratio: 0.94:1 – undersquare/long-stroke, 445.2 cc per cylinder; compression ratio: 10.6:1
cylinder block & crankcase cast aluminium alloy; five main bearings, die-forged steel crankshaft
cylinder heads & valvetrain cast aluminium alloy; four valves per cylinder, 32 valves total, timing belt and simplex chain-driven (hybrid system) double overhead camshafts
fuel system, ignition system, engine management common rail multi-point electronic sequential indirect fuel injection with eight intake manifold-sited fuel injectors; twin Hitachi ignition coils (one per cylinder bank) with Bosch longlife spark plugs, Bosch Motronic electronic engine control unit (ECU); 95 RON/ROZ(91 AKI) EuroPremium (regular) unleaded recommended for optimum performance and fuel economy
DIN-rated motive power & torque output  at 5,800 rpm;  at 4,000 rpm
application Audi V8 (10/88-11/93) 
reference

3.7 V8 32v 169kW 
identification parts code prefix: 077, ID codes: AEW, AKJ
engine displacement & engine configuration  90° V8; bore x stroke: , stroke ratio: 1.03:1 – oversquare/short-stroke, 462.1 cc per cylinder; compression ratio: 10.8:1
cylinder block & crankcase cast aluminium alloy; five main bearings, die-forged steel crankshaft
cylinder heads & valvetrain cast aluminium alloy; four valves per cylinder, 32 valves total, timing belt and simplex chain-driven (hybrid system) double overhead camshafts
fuel system, ignition system, engine management common rail multi-point electronic sequential indirect fuel injection with eight intake manifold-sited fuel injectors; twin LAZ pre-power output stage control units (one per cylinder bank) and eight single spark ignition coils with Bosch longlife spark plugs, Bosch Motronic electronic engine control unit (ECU); 95 RON/ROZ(91 AKI) EuroPremium (regular) unleaded recommended for optimum performance and fuel economy
DIN-rated motive power & torque output  at 5,500 rpm;  at 2,700 rpm
application Audi D2 A8 (AEW: 07/95-12/98, AKJ: 06/97-12/98) 
reference

3.7 V8 40v 191-206kW 
identification parts code prefix: 077
engine displacement & engine configuration  90° V8; bore x stroke: , stroke ratio: 1.03:1 – oversquare/short-stroke, 462.1 cc per cylinder; compression ratio: 11.0:1 (BFL: 11.3:1)
cylinder block & crankcase cast aluminium alloy; five main bearings, die-forged steel crankshaft
cylinder heads & valvetrain cast aluminium alloy; five valves per cylinder, 40 valves total, low friction roller rocker fingers, timing belt and simplex chain-driven (hybrid system) hollow double overhead camshafts, variable inlet camshaft timing
aspiration 3-stage variable composite intake manifold
fuel system, ignition system, engine management common rail multi-point electronic sequential indirect fuel injection with eight intake manifold-sited fuel injectors; eight single spark ignition coils with Bosch longlife spark plugs, Bosch Motronic electronic engine control unit (ECU); 95 RON/ROZ(91 AKI) EuroPremium (regular) unleaded recommended for optimum performance and fuel economy
DIN-rated motive power & torque outputs, ID codes
  at 6,000 rpm;  at 3,250 rpm — AQG, AKC
  at 6,000 rpm;  at 3,750 rpm — BFL
applications Audi D2 A8 (AQG: 10/98-02/01, AKC: 05/00-09/02), Audi D3 A8 (BFL: 11/02-05/06) 
references

4.0 WR8 32v 202kW 

The 'W8' badged engine is an eight-cylinder W engine of four banks of two cylinders, formed by joining two 15° VR4 engines, placed on a single crankshaft, with each cylinder 'double-bank' now at a 72° vee-angle.
identification parts code prefix: 07D, ID codes: BDN (09/01-09/04), BDP (05/02-09/04)
engine displacement & engine configuration  72° WR8 engine; bore x stroke: , stroke ratio: 0.93:1 – undersquare/long-stroke, 499.87 cc per cylinder, compression ratio: 10.8:1
cylinder block & crankcase cast aluminium alloy with two-part cast aluminium alloy oil sump; five main bearings; die-forged steel crankshaft with split crankpins; Lanchester principle balance shafts one above the other, counter-rotating at twice the crankshaft speed, symmetric to the middle of the crankshaft, upper one driven by a toothed belt
cylinder heads & valvetrain cast aluminium alloy; four unequal-length valves per cylinder, 32 valves total, low-friction roller finger cam followers with automatic hydraulic valve clearance compensation, simplex roller chain-driven (relay method, using three chains) double overhead camshafts, continuous vane-adjustable variable valve timing for intake and exhaust camshafts with up to 52° variance inlet camshafts and 22° for exhaust camshafts
aspiration hot-film air mass meter, single throttle body with electronically controlled Bosch 'E-Gas' 'drive by wire' throttle butterfly valve, four-part two-channel cast aluminium resonance intake manifold
fuel system, ignition system, engine management two linked common rail fuel distributor rails, multi-point electronic sequential indirect fuel injection with eight intake manifold-sited fuel injectors; centrally positioned NGK longlife spark plugs, mapped direct ignition with eight individual direct-acting single spark coils; Bosch Motronic ME electronic engine control unit (ECU), cylinder-selective knock control via four knock sensors, permanent lambda control; 95 RON/ROZ(91 AKI) EuroSuperPlus (premium) unleaded recommended for maximum performance and fuel economy
exhaust system vacuum-operated secondary air injection pump for direct injection into exhaust ports to assist cold start operation, one cast iron exhaust manifold per cylinder bank with integrated ceramic catalytic converter per cylinder bank, four heated oxygen sensors monitoring pre- and post catalyst exhaust gasses, EU4 compliant
dimensions mass: , length:  length, width: , height: 
DIN-rated motive power & torque output  at 6,000 rpm;  at 2,750 rpm ( MEP); max. engine speed: 6,400 rpm (19.2 m/s)
application Volkswagen Passat B5.5 W8 4motion
references

Awards 
was voted 'best technical innovation', and awarded the "Golden Pegasus" by "Za ruljom" at the Moscow Motor Show

4.2 V8 32v 206-250kW 
identification parts code prefix: 0215

engine displacement & engine configuration  90° V8; bore x stroke: , stroke ratio: 0.91:1 – undersquare/long-stroke, 521.5 cc per cylinder; compression ratio: 10.3:1 (ABH: 10.8:1)
cylinder block & crankcase cast aluminium alloy; five main bearings, die-forged steel crankshaft
cylinder heads & valvetrain cast aluminium alloy; four valves per cylinder, 32 valves total, timing belt and simplex chain-driven (hybrid system) double overhead camshafts
fuel system, ignition system, engine management common rail multi-point electronic sequential indirect fuel injection with eight intake manifold-sited fuel injectors; Bosch Motronic electronic engine control unit (ECU); 98 RON/ROZ(93 AKI) EuroSuperPlus (premium) unleaded recommended for maximum performance and fuel economy
dimensions mass:  depending on variant
DIN-rated motive power & torque outputs, ID codes
  at 5,800 rpm;  at 4,000 rpm — ABH
  at 5,900 rpm;  at 4,000 rpm — AEC
  at 6,000 rpm;  at 3,000 rpm — ABZ, AKG, ARS, ASG
  at 6,600 rpm;  at 3,500 rpm — AHK
  at 6,600 rpm;  at 3,500 rpm — AHC, AKH, AQJ
applications Audi V8 (ABH: 08/91-11/99), Audi C4 S4 (ABH: 10/92-07/94), Audi C4 S6 (AEC: 09/94-10/97), Audi C5 A6 (ARS: 04/99-05/01, ASG: 06/00-01/05), Audi D2 A8 (ABZ: 06/94-05/99, AKG: 06/97-12/98), Audi C4 S6 Plus (AHK: 06/96-10/97), Audi C5 S6 (AQJ: 09/99-05/01), Audi D2 S8 (AHC: 09/96-12/98, AKH: 08/97-12/98) 
reference

4.2 V8 40v 220-265kW 
identification parts code prefix: 077
engine displacement & engine configuration  90° V8; bore x stroke: , stroke ratio: 0.91:1 – undersquare/long-stroke, 521.5 cc per cylinder; compression ratio: 11.0:1
cylinder block & crankcase cast aluminium alloy; five main bearings, die-forged steel crankshaft
cylinder heads & valvetrain cast aluminium alloy; five valves per cylinder, 40 valves total, timing belt and simplex chain-driven (hybrid system) double overhead camshafts
fuel system, ignition system, engine management two linked common rail fuel distributor rails, multi-point electronic sequential indirect fuel injection with eight intake manifold-sited fuel injectors; Bosch Motronic electronic engine control unit (ECU); 98 RON/ROZ(93 AKI) EuroSuperPlus (premium) unleaded recommended for maximum performance and fuel economy
DIN-rated motive power & torque outputs, ID codes
  at 6,200 rpm;  at 3,000 rpm — ARS, ASG
  at 6,200 rpm;  at 3,000 rpm — AUX, AWN
  at 7,000 rpm;  at 3,400 rpm — AQJ, ANK
  at 7,000 rpm;  at 3,400 rpm — AQH, AVP, AYS, BCS
applications Audi C5 A6 (ARS: 99-00, ASG: 00-04), Audi D2 A8 (AUX: 99-01, AWN: 01-02), Audi C5 S6 (AQJ: 99-01, ANK: 01-04), Audi D2 S8 (AQH: 05/99-02/01, AVP: 09/00-09/02, {Japan only – BCS: 09/00-02/01, AYS: 02/01-09/02})

4.2 V8 40v T 331-353kW (C5 RS6) 
Based on the existing 4.2 V8 from the Audi C5 S6, this engine was tuned with the assistance of VW Group subsidiary Cosworth Technology (now MAHLE Powertrain), and featured two parallel turbochargers, known as 'biturbo', with two side-mounted intercoolers (SMICs).  Enlarged and modified intake and exhaust ports on the new five valve cylinder heads, together with new induction and dual branch exhaust systems, a re-calibrated Motronic engine management system, revised cooling system, and decorative carbon fibre engine covers complete the upgrade.

identification parts code prefix: 077.A
engine displacement & engine configuration  90° V8; bore x stroke: , stroke ratio: 0.91:1 – undersquare/long-stroke, 521.5 cc per cylinder; compression ratio: 9.8:1, two oil coolers – oil:water and oil:air, two or three (dependent on target market) coolant radiators
cylinder block & crankcase cast aluminium alloy; five main bearings, die-forged steel crossplane crankshaft with shared crankpins, two-part oil sump – upper: baffled cast alloy, lower: pressed steel, simplex roller chain driven oil pump
cylinder heads & valvetrain cast aluminium alloy; five valves per cylinder (three inlet, and two sodium-cooled exhaust valves), 40 valves total, low-friction roller-bearing finger cam followers with automatic hydraulic valve clearance compensation, timing belt and simplex roller chain-driven (hybrid system) hollow-tube double overhead camshafts (the crankshaft-driven timing belt operates both exhaust camshafts, which in turn individually chain-drive the inlet camshafts), variable inlet camshaft timing
aspiration two carbon fibre-cased siamesed air filters, two hot-film air mass meters, cast alloy intake manifold with Bosch 'E-Gas' drive by wire electronic throttle control valve, 'biturbo' – two fast-acting turbochargers (one per cylinder bank) with vacuum-actuated excess pressure control, two all-alloy side-mounted intercoolers (SMICs) optimised to prevent pressure loss
fuel system, ignition system, engine management fuel tank sited electric low pressure fuel lift pump, underfloor electric high pressure relay fuel pump, common rail multi-point electronic sequential indirect fuel injection with eight intake manifold-sited fuel injectors; eight individual single-spark ignition coils, NGK longlife spark plugs; Bosch Motronic ME 7.1.1 electronic engine control unit (ECU); 98 RON/ROZ(93 AKI) EuroSuperPlus (premium) unleaded recommended for maximum performance and fuel economy
exhaust system dual-branch exhaust pipes with metallic-element catalytic converters and secondary air injection, four lambda sensors, European EU3 emissions standard
DIN-rated motive power & torque outputs, ID codes & applications
  at 5,700–6,400 rpm;  at 1,950–5,600 rpm — BCY: Audi C5 RS6 (07/02-09/04)
  at 6,000–6,400 rpm;  at 1,950–6,000 rpm — BRV: Audi C5 RS6 Plus (04/04-09/04)
references

Ten cylinder petrols

5.0 V10 40v (Lamborghini)
Only the third engine developed by Automobili Lamborghini S.p.A., and the first since Lamborghini was acquired by AUDI AG, this engine shares many technologies with other Audi-developed engines, although it is not directly based on any existing designs. It is constructed in two distinct stages: all components within the cylinder block and crankcase are built up at the Audi Hungaria Motor Kft. factory in Győr, with final assembly being completed at Sant'Agata Bolognese.

engine displacement & engine configuration  90° V10 engine; bore x stroke: , stroke ratio: 0.89:1 – undersquare/long-stroke, 496.1 cc per cylinder; compression ratio: 11.5:1; dry sump lubrication system
cylinder block & crankcase cast aluminium alloy with integrated liners with eutectic alloy;  cylinder bore spacing; die-forged steel crankshaft with split crankpins (to create even 72 deg firing interval with the 90 deg vee-angle)
cylinder heads & valvetrain cast aluminium alloy; four valves per cylinder, 40 valves total, low-friction roller finger cam followers with automatic hydraulic valve clearance compensation, chain driven double overhead camshafts, continuously variable valve timing system both for intake and exhaust
aspiration two air filters, two hot-film air mass meters, two cast alloy throttle bodies each with electronically controlled 'drive by wire' throttle butterfly valves, cast magnesium alloy variable geometry and resonance intake manifold
fuel system two linked common rail fuel distributor rails, multi-point electronic sequential indirect fuel injection with ten intake manifold-sited fuel injectors
ignition system & engine management mapped direct ignition with centrally mounted spark plugs and ten individual direct-acting single spark coils; two Lamborghini LIE electronic engine control units (ECUs) working on the 'master and slave' concept due to the high revving nature of the engine
exhaust system five-into-one exhaust manifolds for each cylinder bank
DIN-rated motive power & torque outputs
  at 7,800 rpm;  at 4,500 rpm (80% available from 1,500 rpm) — 2003–2005
  at 8,000 rpm;  at 4,250 rpm — SE, Spyder, and 2006-on
  at 8,000 rpm;  at 4,250 rpm — Superleggera
application Lamborghini Gallardo
references

Twelve cylinder petrols

6.2/6.5 V12 48v (Lamborghini) 
This was a legacy engine, an original 3.5 litre version was developed nearly 50 years before the takeover of Automobili Lamborghini S.p.A. by the German Volkswagen Group subsidiary AUDI AG. The current 6.2 and 6.5 litre versions can trace their lineage to the original. The final model to use this was the Murciélago, which was released during the current VW Group ownership, developed with help from Audi.

engine configuration 60° V12 engine; dry sump lubrication system
engine displacement etc.
6.2: ; bore x stroke: , stroke ratio: 1.00:1 – 'square engine', 516.0 cc per cylinder; compression ratio: 11.6:1
6.5: ; bore x stroke:  (stroke ratio: 0.99:1 – 'square engine'); 541.3 cc per cylinder; compression ratio: 11.8:1
cylinder block & crankcase cast aluminium alloy
cylinder heads & valvetrain cast aluminium alloy; four valves per cylinder, 48 valves total, double overhead camshafts
aspiration two air filters, four cast alloy throttle bodies each with Magneti Marelli electronically controlled 'drive by wire' throttle butterfly valves, cast magnesium alloy intake manifold
fuel system & ignition system two linked common rail fuel distributor rails, multi-point electronic sequential indirect fuel injection with twelve intake manifold-sited fuel injectors; centrally positioned spark plugs, mapped direct ignition with 12 individual direct-acting single spark coils
exhaust system two 3-branch exhaust manifolds per cylinder bank, connected to dual-inlet catalytic converters, heated oxygen (lambda) sensors monitoring pre- and post-catalyst exhaust gasses
DIN-rated motive power & torque outputs
6.5:  — Reventón
applications 2004 Lamborghini Murciélago LP640 Coupé and Roadster, Lamborghini Reventón
reference German press release: auto katalog 2006

See also 

list of Volkswagen Group petrol engines (current)
list of Volkswagen Group diesel engines (current)
list of discontinued Volkswagen Group diesel engines
list of North American Volkswagen engines
Wasserboxer
VR6 engine
G-Lader
G60 – for detailed development info and progression of forced induction in Volkswagen Group engines
Turbocharged Direct Injection (TDI)
Suction Diesel Injection (SDI)
BlueMotion
list of Volkswagen Group platforms
list of Volkswagen Group factories

References

External links 
VolkswagenAG.com – Volkswagen Group corporate website
Chemnitz (Germany) – engine plant Mobility and Sustainability
Kassel (Germany) – engine plant Mobility and Sustainability
Salzgitter (Germany) – engine plant Mobility and Sustainability
Polkowice (Poland) – engine plant Mobility and Sustainability
São Carlos (Brazil) – engine plant Mobility and Sustainability
Shanghai (China) – engine plant Mobility and Sustainability
Audi at a glance – includes information on the Győr engine plant 

Gasoline engines by model
Lists of automobile engines
Straight-six engines